Cicindela aurulenta, common name blue-spotted or golden-spotted tiger beetle, is a beetle of the family Carabidae.

Description
C. aurulenta have polychromatic and iridescent external appearance. This species has blue-green elytra, with six large yellowish-white or bluish spots and two smaller spots on the shoulders. The medial large spot is somewhat more crescent-shaped compared to the anterior and posterior spots. Its elytra appears reddish-orange along the base and margins. When viewed dorsally, head and thorax are blue-green, with appearances of red-orange under certain light conditions due to its iridescent colouration. It has two prominent compound eyes and large, predominantly black mandibles with yellowish-white marking at its base. It has a labrum that's ivory-white with black base and margins. Its antennae is filiform. Its scape, pedicel, and first two flagellum are blue-green; while the remaining flagellum are dull black. It has pale colored hairs on the abdomen and legs.

Distribution
C. aurulenta is widespread throughout the Indo-Malaya region. This species is distributed across Nepal, Bhutan, India, China, and Southeast Asia. It ranges as far south as the islands of Borneo, Sumatra, and the Lesser Sundas, such as Bali. Several subspecies variations co-occur within these regions.

Habitat 
C. aurulenta can be found in a wide range of sandy habitats, including riverbars, forest trails, and sand dunes near shorelines and mangroves.

Taxonomy 
This species is currently placed in the genus Cicindela and in the subgenus Cosmodela Rivalier, 1961. This species has several subspecies, with varying and overlapping geographical ranges between one another.  

The recognised subspecies of C. aurulenta:

 C. a. aurulenta Fabricius, 1801 — Malaysia, Indonesia
 C. a. juxtata Acciavatti & Pearson, 1989 — India, Mainland Southeast Asia, southern parts of China, Hong Kong
 C. a. flavomaculata Chevrolat, 1845 — India, Myanmar, China, Laos, Cambodia, Thailand, Malaysia, Indonesia
 C. a. virgula Fleutiaux, 1893 — Nepal, India, Bhutan, Myanmar, China, Laos, Thailand, Vietnam

Some authors consider Cosmodela to be a distinct genus whereby the subspecific epithets are classified as their own species.

References

 Universal Biological Indexer
 William Jardine The naturalist's library

External links
 Es.Mongabay

aurulenta
Beetles described in 1801